is a 1998 adventure game developed by FromSoftware for the PlayStation. It is the first game in the Echo Night series, following up with the Japan-exclusive Echo Night 2: The Lord of Nightmares in 1999, and Echo Night: Beyond in 2004. A port for the PlayStation Portable was included with Adventure Player, an adventure game creation tool, which was released in Japan on June 30, 2005. A fan translation  of the port was released in 2022, translating its title as Echo Night: The First Voyage.

The story revolves around Richard Osmond, the game's protagonist, and his journey to find out what happened to the ship Orpheus, which mysteriously disappeared from the sea. The story also uncovers the mystery of two stones that contain some kind of supernatural power.

Gameplay
Echo Night is played from a first-person perspective. When confronted by a ghost, the player must turn on the lights in the room by means of a light switch. The player is often transported into the past via the passengers or certain objects. Once the player fulfills a task important to a spirit, they will vanish and drop an "Astral Piece", which can be used to get a different ending scene.

Plot
The game starts with Richard at his apartment receiving a call from the Anchor Police Department regarding his father, Henry Osmond. Summoned to his father's house, Richard discovers his father's diary, which leads him to a train. He meets at the train a man named Henry Osmond, who is actually trying to pursue William Rockwell who, according to Henry, is being possessed by the Red Stone that is attached to a knife. They duel inside the train, but William uses his granddaughter, Crea Rockwell, as a defense against Henry. William then shot Henry, but the bullet hit the Blue Stone from the latter's chest. The Blue Stone was split into two, one half of which Henry gave to William's granddaughter, Crea. It is revealed then that William is being possessed by the demon of the Red Stone. After that, Richard is brought back to his father's house, where he discovers inside the secret room a painting of the ship, Orpheus.

Richard is brought to Orpheus and meets the passengers who died when the ship disappeared. Richard saves the souls he meets inside the ship by resolving their personal issues. As the game goes on, Richard discovers that the Red Stone which William possesses has the power to change one's destiny to their desire by killing people using the knife the Red Stone is attached to. Richard meets William's son and daughter, who are aware of the story of the Red Stone and plan to kill their father on the ship, but were killed by him first. Richard also meets Crea Rockwell through time travel, and is able to retrieve the Blue Stone. At the game's climax, Richard discovers that his father was on the ship too, and was able to kill William. But as soon as Henry gets hold of the stone, he proclaims that he desired the Red Stone all along. Richard is able to destroy the Red Stone using the Blue Stone. After the Red Stone is destroyed, Henry instructs Richard to leave the ship, and the ship itself disappears soon after.

If the player fails to leave the ship, an article states that Richard Osmond and his father were mysteriously lost in an accident. If the player reaches the nose of the ship and doesn't enter the secret passage, Crea saves Richard, who awakes in his father's house. He leaves the house and approaches the policemen in the car, who ask Richard to get tools from the trunk as the car won't start. When Richard opens up the trunk, he finds the red knife in there. Reaching the nose of the ship and entering the secret passage leads to a dialogue with a blind man, with two additional endings depending on the player's choice: if the player takes the red knife, Richard awakes in his father's house and kills the policemen, as he is now possessed by the red knife. Refusing to take the red knife destroys it, after which Crea saves Richard, with several scenes and messages from her being shown in the last scene at Richard's house.

Reception

The game received "mixed" reviews according to the review aggregation website GameRankings.

Japanese gaming magazine Famitsu gave the game a 32 out of 40 score.

References

External links

1998 video games
First-person adventure games
FromSoftware games
Video games about ghosts
PlayStation (console) games
PlayStation Portable games
1990s horror video games
Video games developed in Japan
Video games scored by Kota Hoshino
Video games with alternate endings
Single-player video games
Agetec games